The Zoopagales is an order of fungi in the subdivision Zoopagomycotina. Most species are parasites or predators of microscopic animals such as amoebae. They also prey on rotifers. The order contains 5 families, 22 genera, and 190 species.

References

External links
 Zoopagales at Zygomycetes.org

Zygomycota
Fungus orders